Ram Kumar may refer to:

 Ramkumar (born 1968), Indian actor
 Ram Kumar (artist) (1924–2018), Indian artist
 Ram Kumar (basketball) (born 1964), Indian basketball player
 Ram Kumar (politician) (born 1957), Indian politician

See also
 Ramkumar Ganesan, Indian film producer